Cline's Church of the United Brethren in Christ, also known as Cline's United Methodist Church, is a historic Brethren church on Cline's Church Road, 0.5 miles south of PA 34 at Menallen Township, Adams County, Pennsylvania. It was built in 1850, and is a one-story, plain rectangular limestone building with a low gable roof. It measures 35 feet wide and 46 feet deep. The interior is a single room with white plastered walls and ceiling.  Located adjacent to the church is the Cline's Cemetery, with grave markers dated from the mid-1800s to the present.

It was listed on the National Register of Historic Places in 2002.

References

External links

Cline's UMC Homepage

Methodist churches in Pennsylvania
Churches on the National Register of Historic Places in Pennsylvania
Cemeteries in Pennsylvania
Federal architecture in Pennsylvania
Churches completed in 1850
19th-century churches in the United States
Churches in Adams County, Pennsylvania
National Register of Historic Places in Adams County, Pennsylvania